Sarah Tan (born 1 August 1980 in the United Kingdom) is a British Channel V VJ and a 987FM DJ and a Singapore resident.

Her father is Chinese and her mother is English. She has two younger sisters, Kathryn and Laura. She attended an all-girls boarding school in Shropshire, England, when she was 13. Several years later she returned to Singapore to finish high school at the United World College of South East Asia. Later, she enrolled in the University of Surrey and graduated with a degree in English literature.

Tan previously worked as a bartender and a shop assistant at Chanel. She began her modeling career when she was 16 with the prestigious Elite Models Singapore agency. It was through this agency that she received the coveted VJ spot on Channel V International. Apart from VJ-ing for Channel V, she is currently hosting a dating show called A Light Affair which is aired on MediaCorp TV Channel 5 Singapore. She also hosts Spellcast on Okto. As a model, she has been the cover girl for various magazines such as Flirt, Seventeen, Her World and in Malaysia's Newtide and Female, as well as Singapore's Newman magazine.

Despite her fame in Malaysia, she was virtually unknown in her own country, Singapore, when she first started VJ-ing for Channel [V], because the show was not aired in Singapore.

In 2005, Tan signed with modelling agency Mannequin Studio.

She is currently affiliated to 3 different modeling agencies; one in Singapore, one in Thailand, and the last one in Hong Kong. Tan was voted fifth-sexiest woman in Asia FHM's 100 Sexiest Women in the World for 2003 and third-sexiest woman in Asia FHM's 100 Sexiest Women in the World for 2004.

Personal life
Tan is married to Soo Kui Jien, another host of TV show A Light Affair. They tied the knot on 21 December 2007 after being in a relationship for two and a half years. The ceremony took place in Bali, Indonesia.

In April 2008, she gave birth to a son named Dylan Robert Soo. In March 2010, she joined 987FM and begun hosting a weekday lunchtime show. in 2014 she gave birth to a pair of twins, a boy and a girl.

See also 
 Channel V
 Paula Malai Ali

References

1980 births
Living people
Singaporean television personalities
VJs (media personalities)
Alumni of the University of Surrey
Singaporean people of English descent
Singaporean expatriates in Malaysia
Singaporean people of Chinese descent
People educated at a United World College